Abrashev is a Bulgarian family name and it may refer to:

 Peter Abrashev (1866-1930) - Bulgarian lawyer, scientist and politician;
 George Abrashev (born 1924) - Bulgarian choreographer;
 Bozhidar Abrashev (1936-2006) - Bulgarian composer and Minister of Culture;
 Stoyan Abrashev (born 1988) - Bulgarian footballer